John L. Henderson, Ed.D. (born 1932) is an American university administrator. He was President of Wilberforce University from 1988 to 2002, and the first black president of the Council of Independent Colleges.

From 2007 to 2010, Dr. Henderson served as President (Interim) of Cincinnati State Technical and Community College, during which enrollment surpassed 10,000 students for the first time.

His papers are held at the Johnnie Mae Berry Library, Cincinnati State Technical and Community College.

References

External links
 Dr. John Henderson

1932 births
Living people
Wilberforce University
Heads of universities and colleges in the United States